Elections to the Adur District Council were held on 3 May 1984, with one third of the council up for election. There was no elections held for the single-member St Mary's ward. Overall turnout was recorded at 45.6%.

The election resulted in the council remaining under no overall control.

Election result

This resulted in the following composition of the council:

Ward results

+/- figures represent changes from the last time these wards were contested.

References

1984
1984 English local elections
1980s in West Sussex